Lamma may refer to:
Lamma Island, Hong Kong
a dialect of the Western Pantar language of Indonesia
Lamma, Sumerian name for Lamassu, a protective female deity
LAMMA show, an agricultural show in the United Kingdom
LAMMA, abbreviation for laser microprobe mass analyzer

See also 
 Lammas